The State Fair Meadowlands (formerly the Meadowlands Fair) is a carnival held every summer at the Meadowlands Sports Complex in East Rutherford, New Jersey. The fair is held in the parking lot that surrounds the MetLife Stadium and runs for two weeks in late June and early July. It attracts over 300,000 visitors per year, peaking at around 400,000 people in 2022.

Despite its name, it is not the official state fair of New Jersey; instead, that honor belongs to the Sussex County Farm and Horse Show, which earned the state fair moniker in 1999. Instead, the name for the Meadowlands event is a title sponsorship; State Fair Superstore, a large seasonal merchandise seller in Belleville, New Jersey, operates the carnival.

There were cancellations in 1942–45 for World War II and 2020 for the COVID-19 pandemic.

List of attractions

Family/Kiddie Rides 

 Bumble Bee
 Construction Zone
 Merry-Go-Round
 Double-Decker Carousel
 Elephants
 Family Swinger
 Fire Chief
 Frog Hopper
 Speedway
 Go Gator
 Happy Swing
 Jalopy Junction
 Jet Ski/Waverunner
 Jungle of Fun
 Mini Bumper Boats
 Mini Himalaya
 Mini-Indy
 Monkey Mayhem
 Motorcycles
 Quadrunners
 Rainbow Rock
 Red Baron
 Rockin' Tug
 Safari Train
 Tomb of Doom
 VW Cars
 Wacky Worm

Thrill Rides 

 Banzai	
 Bumper Cars
 Cliffhanger
 Crazy Mouse
 Crazy Outback
 Cuckoo Fun House
 Darton Slide
 Disko
 Enterprise
 Fireball
 Giant Wheel
 Gravitron
 Haunted House Dark Ride
 Haunted Mansion Dark Ride
 Heavy Haulin’ Inflate
 Himalaya
 Magic Maze
 Mardi Gras Glasshouse
 Musik Express
 Raiders Funhouse
 Ring of Fire
 Rock & Roll Funhouse
 Rock 'n Roll
 Scooter
 Sizzler
 Sky Ride
 Skyflyer
 Space Roller
 Spongebob Funhouse
 Storybookland – Peter Pan's Palace
 Super Slide
 Tilt-A-Whirl
 Tornado 3
 Wave Swinger
 Zyklon

Other attractions 
Other than the rides, there are free shows and events at the fair such as racing pigs, a petting zoo, a circus, a magic show, etc. The fair also displays fireworks on select nights.

Incidents 
At around 11:30 PM on June 22, 2017, which was the opening night for the 2017 season of the fair, gunshots were fired on the fairgrounds. Guests ran away from the area where the shots were being fired off. No one was shot or injured.

References

External links 
State Fair Meadowlands Site
New Jersey State Fair Site

Tourist attractions in Bergen County, New Jersey
Buildings and structures in Bergen County, New Jersey
State fairs
June events
July events